The California–Ukraine National Guard Partnership is one of 25 European partnerships that make up the U.S. European Command State Partnership Program and one of 88 worldwide partnerships that make-up the National Guard State Partnership Program (SPP). The
California-Ukraine SPP is one of the most important and progressive partnerships within European Command. Ukraine's size and strategic location make it one of the most influential countries in the region, thus making the SPP a key factor in assisting Ukraine as it develops it budding democracy.

Through the SPP, the California National Guard and Ukraine have addressed a broad range of social, economic, military and political issues including border security, base conversion, emergency response, inter-agency cooperation, civil-military relations and security cooperation. With hundreds of events completed since its inception in June 1999, the SPP has become a sophisticated engagement tool that brings together civilian expertise, multi-level government agencies, NATO, non-government organizations and commercial interests.

According to the Office of International Affairs, California Military Department "The Office of International Affairs manages the State Partnership Program (SPP) with Ukraine. The SPP deploys California National Guard teams to Ukraine and brings Ukrainians to the United States for information sharing to assist Armed Forces of Ukraine in re-structuring, modernizing its forces, and strengthening principles of democracy and free market economies. Exchanges include information about the processes underpinning US military structures that result in subordination to civilian control, consensus building, methodologies for achieving objectives, and interagency coordination of civil/military issues. Future missions for International Relations will include partnerships with other countries to bring the same philosophy to these regions of the world as has been done successfully in the Baltics."

According to the Office of Defense Cooperation in Kiev, "The California – Ukraine partnership directly supports both the goals of the US Ambassador to Ukraine and Commander, U.S. European Command. As part of the Governor's Cabinet, the Adjutant General of the California National Guard facilitates partnerships throughout the state and local governments in California as well as the private sector.  Recently, a tuberculosis clinic in Odessa was renovated with funds provided by this office."

History
"The California SPP has been an extremely valuable tool for building lasting and meaningful relations with Ukraine and we look forward to its continued success. The SPP has provided California the opportunity to demonstrate the capabilities of our state's military around the world." - MG William Wade II, former Adjutant General, California National Guard

California partnered with Ukraine in 1993 as it emerged from the Cold War, unsure about its relationship with the United States. The program has helped Ukraine develop its own military and civilian capacities for security, emergency management and organization.  The foundation of their cooperation has been built upon exercises like PEACE SHIELD and RAPID TRIDENT. California and Ukraine have trained together is these multinational exercises, hosted by Ukraine, for over 15 years. This partnership will transition to SABER GUARDIAN in 2014 and beyond.

While not seeking to enter NATO, Ukraine is committed to all NATO deployments and achieving NATO interoperability through development of Rapid Reaction Forces. The EU has been seeking a closer relationship by moving beyond regional cooperation toward gradual economic integration and deepening of political cooperation; however, a strategic EU trade agreement is currently on hold due to selective prosecutions. Ukraine is currently trimming military forces by 30% as part of a new Strategic Defense Initiative. In 2012, a new Minister of Defense and Chief of Defense were appointed.

In 2011, California participated in the single largest Air National Guard exchange in the partnerships history. Members of the California Air National Guard travelled to Mirgorod Air Base, Ukraine to conduct a two-week training exercise called SAFE SKIES 2011. A squadron of six Fighting Falcon F-16's from the Air National Guard lead the multinational Air Superiority exercise, which was designed to prepare Ukraine for real world missions it would face during EUROCUP 2012. California and Ukraine had been planning SAFE SKIES 2011 for over 3 years and its execution helped strengthen bonds between these former enemies of the Cold War. During the exercise, more than 60 air sovereignty mock intercepts took place using Ukrainian Su-27s and MiG-29s, and American and Polish F-16s. The exercise laid the foundation for a SAFE and SECURE EUROCUP Tournament as well as future training opportunities with Ukraine.

In 2012, Californian and Ukrainian Soldiers participated in six joint engagements, including international exchanges in cyber defense, CBRNE (Chemical, Biological, Radiological, Nuclear, Explosive) Response, maintenance, and NCO/Officer roles and relationships. California also supported the multinational exercise "Rapid Trident" hosted in Ukraine with participation from 14 partner nations. Since 2000, Californian and Ukrainian Soldiers have participated in over 330 Military-to-Military events.

The California National Guard has made humanitarian assistance one of the consistent facets of every deployment.  Through the many years of our partnership with Ukraine, the California National Guard has provided the following support to children and families across Ukraine;  California National Guard members have provided school and art supplies and sports equipment to schools in Mirgorod and Starichy.  California National Guard members have volunteered hundreds of hours at orphanages in the Kiev and Lviv regions.  California National Guard members have helped with school renovations and painting in the Lviv region.

Focus
The focus for 2013 and beyond includes: NCO Roles and Organizational Maintenance, English Language Training, Strategic Airlift Interoperability, Human Resources and Personnel Management, EURO Atlantic Interoperability, Humanitarian Assistance, Development of the European Union (EU) Battle Group, and the TRILATERAL Brigade (from Lithuania/Poland/Ukraine).

References

External links

National Guard Bureau SPP
U.S. European Command SPP
EUCOM Partnership page for California-Ukraine
The California National Guard SPP
Department of Defense News on the California-Ukraine Partnership
National Guard Bureau SPP News Archives

Military alliances involving the United States
Ukraine–United States military relations
National Guard (United States)